Papias Malimba Musafiri, is a Rwandan academic, researcher and politician, who has served as the  Minister of Education in the Rwandan cabinet, since 25 June 2015, replacing Prof. Silas Lwakabamba.

Background and education
He holds a Bachelor of Commerce, obtained from the University of Dar es Salaam. He also holds a Master of Business Administration with majors in Finance and Information Technology, obtained from the Indian Institute of Technology Roorkee. His Doctor of Philosophy in management was awarded by Vellore Institute of Technology, also in India.

Career
Circa 2001, Musafiri has served in various roles in academia, research and as a consultant. Prior to the establishment of the University of Rwanda (UR) in 2013, he held senior management positions in several institutions that today comprise the UR. He has served as (a) Director of Administration and Human Resources (b) Dean, Faculty of Management (c) Vice Rector Academics and (d) Acting Rector, in former institutions of higher education. Immediately prior to his appointment as education minister, he was the Principal of the College of Business and Economics (CBE) of the University of Rwanda.

In the cabinet reshuffle of 5 October 2016, and that of 31 August 2017, he was retained in cabinet and he retained the education portfolio. In his role as minister of education, he announced the termination and expulsion of Ugandan teachers from Rwanda, following the expiry of their teaching contracts.

See also
 Education in Rwanda
 Parliament of Rwanda

References

External links
Website of the Rwanda Ministry of Education (Mineduc) 

Living people
Year of birth missing (living people)
Education ministers of Rwanda
University of Dar es Salaam alumni
IIT Roorkee alumni
Vellore Institute of Technology alumni
Academic staff of the University of Rwanda